HMS Indus was an 80-gun two-deck second-rate ship of the line of the Royal Navy, launched on 16 March 1839 at Portsmouth Dockyard.

The design of Indus was based upon the Danish , captured during the Second Battle of Copenhagen. She was originally ordered in 1817 as a 74-gun ship, but the order was amended in 1820 to an 80-gunner.

She was attached to the Mediterranean fleet, and commanded by Captain Houston Stewart until 30 October 1840, when Captain James Stirling took over as captain, serving until June 1844. Captain John Charles Dalrymple Hay had her until 25 November 1856, during which time she served as Rear-Admiral Houston Stewart's flagship, based at Devonport. Captain William King-Hall was her next commander, and she continued to serve as Houston Stewart's flagship, now on the North American and West Indian stations.

In 1860 Indus was converted to serve as a guardship. She was sold out of the service in 1898.

Notes

References

 Mid-Victorian RN vessel HMS Indus. Retrieved 20 November 2007.
  The Royal Navy in Nova Scotia Waters - HMS Indus. Nova Scotia Archives & Records Management. Retrieved 29 August 2016.
 Lavery, Brian (2003) The Ship of the Line - Volume 1: The development of the battlefleet 1650-1850. Conway Maritime Press. .

External links
 

Ships of the line of the Royal Navy
Battleships of the Royal Navy
Ships built in Portsmouth
1839 ships
Victorian-era battleships of the United Kingdom